Farma (series 2), is the second series of Farma, the Polish version of the reality television franchise The Farm. The season consists of 16 Poles live on a farm like it was 100 years ago. Much like last season, they'll have to carry out tasks to earn prizes and luxury for the farm. The winner will receive 100,000 zł. The season premiered on 2 January 2023. In the end, Tomasz Wędzony won in a public vote against Gabriele Dadej and Urszula Karpała to claim the grand prize and be crowned Farma 2023.

Finishing order
(ages stated are at time of contest)

The game

Notes

References

External links

The Farm (franchise)
Polish reality television series
2020s Polish television series